The transportation system in Greenland is very unusual in that Greenland has no railways, no inland waterways, and virtually no roads between towns. Historically the major means of transportation has been by boat around the coast in summer and by dog sled in winter, particularly in the north and east. Nowadays air travel, by helicopter or other aircraft, is the main way of travel.

Air transport

While Germany occupied Denmark during World War II, the United States controlled Greenland and built bases and airports. The airports were codenamed as Bluie West One through to Bluie West Eight on the west of the island and Bluie East One to Bluie East Four on the eastern side (some had only sea plane access, some no air access). The largest of those airports, Bluie West Eight, now renamed Kangerlussuaq Airport, remains the international hub for travel to Greenland, as it is the only airport that has a long enough runway to service large jets (not counting Thule Airbase). American authorities at one time entertained the idea of building a road from Kangerlussuaq to the second-largest airport, in Narsarsuaq, several hundred kilometres to the south. The idea was abandoned after feasibility studies failed to prove it was possible. These airbases are generally not located near settlements, so travellers need an air transfer by helicopter (small plane from Kangerlussuaq) to reach settlements. All civil aviation matters are handled by the Civil Aviation Administration Denmark or the Greenland Airport Authority.

Greenland now has 18 airstrips, 14 of which are paved. Some are based on US airbases, but most are built by the Greenlandic government. All domestic flights are operated by Air Greenland. The name was anglicized in 2002 from the Danish Grønlandsfly (Greenlandair in English). International flights are limited to four weekly flights from Copenhagen to Kangerlussuaq, and to Reykjavík, Iceland.

Icelandair flies from Reykjavík to Narsarsuaq. It offers also "day trips to the wilderness" from Reykjavík to Kulusuk on the east coast. Icelandair flies to Ittoqqortoormiit over Kulusuk once or twice a week throughout the year. Flights from Reykjavik are operated throughout the year. Also, year-round flights from Reykjavik to Ilulissat will be offered after April 2011. From 2012 Air Greenland operates a route from Iqaluit in Canada to Nuuk during summer.

Air cargo is very important for Greenland. Most perishable foodstuff is imported from Denmark by air. It uses the Air Greenland Copenhagen–Kangerlussuaq passenger aircraft, and this is a reason why such a large aircraft is used. The air containers are then transported to the other airports by small planes that can use the small runways. Some air cargo is transported by boat from Kangerlussuaq, but not in the winter when the Kangerlussuaq Fjord freezes (one of the reasons to build the Sisimiut–Kangerlussuaq road).

A state-owned firm called Kalaallit Airports is since 2017 tasked with operating and updating the airports in Nuuk and Ilulissat. This process has been contentious as Chinese firms bid for the contract, with one Danish PM stating "We don't want a communist dictatorship in our backyard."

Roads
There are no roads between settlements, only within them and around them.
There are 150 km (90 mi) of roads in the whole country; 60 km (40 mi) of the roads are paved. The roads are primary or local roads, there are no highways in Greenland.

There is a 4.5 km long asphalt road between the towns of Ivittuut and Kangilinnguit.

Some farms in the south have fairly extensive very simple roads for all-terrain vehicles (not included in the above figures), used for sheep farming and hay collection. There are some other short simple gravel roads, such as that leading from the shore to hydropower plants.

There are plans for a  road between Sisimiut and Kangerlussuaq, discussed for several years. In 2015 the cost of it (500 million Danish krone) caused it to be replanned as a one-lane road for terrain-capable vehicles, costing a tenth as much (50 million Danish krone). It was decided including financing in 2019, a contract with a construction company signed in 2020 and is expected to be built in 2021.

Water transport
There are ports at Ilulissat, Kangerlussuaq (also known by its Danish name Søndre Strømfjord), Qaqortoq, Narsaq, Nuuk (Godthåb), Aasiaat and Sisimiut. Several other towns have also small ports. The main users of the harbors are Royal Arctic Line and Arctic Umiaq Line. Royal Arctic Line organises freight ships, for example container ships, with regular sailings from Denmark. Arctic Umiaq Line runs a passenger ship which also carries freight. The distance from Denmark to Nuuk by ship is 3,800 kilometres (2,400 mi/2,000 nmi/4 days at 20 knots), so more perishable foodstuff is imported by air.

There are no car ferries in or to Greenland. It is possible to transport cars as container freight with Royal Arctic Line (both domestic and from Denmark). Passengers must travel by another method. This is done mostly when moving or buying a car, not normally when travelling, as there is no large road network anywhere.

Many of the tourists to Greenland arrive by cruise ship.

Railways
Historically, special-purpose narrow gauge railways, such as the  gauge Qoornoq X-press in the village of Qoornoq in the Nuuk fjord, have operated. The Qoornoq X-press was used for transporting fish from the harbour to scaffolds for drying. The railway cars were only flatbed wagon cars with no locomotives to move them.

Built in 1955, the railway was abandoned shortly before the village around 1971.

Besides Qoornoq there are several other railways that existed in Greenland:

 Malmbjerg
 Mestersvig – likely for the local mines that existed in the 1950s and 1960s
 Julianehaab
 Ivigtut – likely for the local mine that once operated in the community
 Disko Island near Qutdligssat
 Maamorilik

References

External links